Libslack is a library of general utilities designed to make UNIX/C programming a bit easier on the eye. It is a seemingly random collection of modules and functions.  It was originally implemented as part of the "daemon" program (although some of the code dates back much further).

It's a small library with much functionality, accurately documented and thoroughly tested. Good library naming conventions are not rigorously observed on the principle that common operations should always be easy to write and code should always be easy to read.

Libslack is freely available under the GNU General Public License.

See also

glibc

External links
libslack homepage

C (programming language) libraries
Free computer libraries